Kirkwood is an unincorporated farming town and census-designated place (CDP) in Colerain Township, Lancaster County, Pennsylvania, United States. It is part of the Lancaster Metro area, in Pennsylvania Dutch Country. The ZIP code is 17536. As of the 2010 census the population was 396.

History
The post office in Kirkwood was established in 1856. A school was built in Kirkwood in 1899. Amish settlers arrived in Kirkwood in 1935 when Isaac and Mary Zook and their nine children moved to the area.

Geography
Kirkwood is located at coordinates 39° 50' 50" N 76° 5' 0" W, in southeastern Lancaster County and the center of Colerain Township. Pennsylvania Route 472 passes through the center of town, leading northwest  to Quarryville and southeast  to Oxford in Chester County.

The community drains west to the West Branch of Octoraro Creek and east to the East Branch. Via Octoraro Creek, the Kirkwood is part of the Susquehanna River water.

Demographics

According to the 2010 census, there were 396 people residing in Kirkwood. The population density was 110.84 inhabitants per km. Of the 396 inhabitants, Kirkwood was made up of 98.23% white, 0% were African-American, 0.25% were Amerindian, 0% were Asian, 0.25% were Pacific Islanders, 1.26% were from other races, and 0 % belonged to two or more races. Of the total population, 4.29% were Hispanic or Latino of any race.

Economy
Kreider's Market was founded by Lloyd and Mary Lois Kreider in Kirkwood. Kirkwood is home to the trucking company Lester M Prange. Jim Neary’s Bait & Tackle is located in Kirkwood.

References

Census-designated places in Lancaster County, Pennsylvania
Census-designated places in Pennsylvania